Inveraldie is a village in Angus, Scotland. It lies on the north-bound side of the A90 road, two miles north of Dundee.

References

Villages in Angus, Scotland